A Tale of Two Cities is a 1980 American historical drama film made for TV, directed by Jim Goddard and starring Chris Sarandon, who plays dual roles as two characters who are in love with the same woman. It is based on the 1859 Charles Dickens novel of the same name set in the French Revolution.

Premise
A London lawyer (Sydney Carton) decides how much he will sacrifice for the woman he loves in Paris during the Reign of Terror.

Cast
 Chris Sarandon - Charles Darnay / Sydney Carton
 Alice Krige - Lucie Manette
 Peter Cushing -  Dr. Alexandre Manette
 Kenneth More -  Jarvis Lorry
 Barry Morse - Marquis St. Evrémonde
 Flora Robson - Miss Pross
 Billie Whitelaw - Madame Therese Defarge
 Nigel Hawthorne - CJ Stryver
 Norman Jones - Ernest Defarge
 George Innes - Jerry Cruncher 
 David Suchet - John Barsad
 Bernard Hug - Gaspard
 Valérie de Tilbourg - Seamstress (credited as Valerie de Tilburg)
 Robert Urquhart - Attorney General
 Anna Manahan - Vengeance
 Gerald James - Gabelle
 Bernard Archard - Court President
 Martha Parsey - Little Lucie
 Robin Scobey - Victor
 John Kidd - Chemist
 Dennis Gimes French Soldier

Crew
 Opening Credits
 Music composed and conducted by Allyn Ferguson
 Edited by Bill Blunden
 Director of photography: Tony Imi, B.S.C.
 Produced by Norman Rosemont
 Written for television by John Gay
 Based on the novel: A Tale of Two Cities by Charles DickensCopyright 1980 Marble Arch Productions Inc.
 Directed by Jim Goddard
 Closing End Credits
 Production Designer: John Stoll
 Associate Producer: William Hill
 Costume Designer: Olga Lehmann
 Production Manager - England: Ray Frift　　　　　　　　　　- France: Dorothy Marchini
 Assistant Director - England: Bert Batt　　　　　　　　　- France: Carlo Lusticati
 Art Director - England: Bill Bennison　　　　　　- France: Jean Boulet
 Camera Operator: Tony White
 Gaffer: John Fenner (uncredited)
 Sound Recording: Cyril Swern
 Dubbing Mixer: Trevor White
 Sound Editor: John Ireland
 Assistant Editor: Noel Rogers
 Continuity: Doreen Soan
 Make-Up: Robin Grantham, Lindy Shaw
 Hairdressers: Jeanette Freeman, Dorothy Ioannou, Stephanie Hall
 Wardrobe Supervisor: Paul Vachon
 Wardrobe Mistress: Helen Gill
 Casting Director: Irene Lamb
 Set Decorator: Simon Wakefield
 Property Master: Jack Townes
 Construction Manager: Bill MacLaren
 Supervising Electrician: John Fenner
 Production Assistant: Liz Green
 Production Accountant: Peter Harvey
 Stills Photographer: Joe Pearce
 Unit Publicist: Geoff Freeman
 Special Effects Supervisor: John Richardson
 Action Arranger: Gerry Crampton
 Costumes by Bermans & Nathans Limited
 Processed by Rank Film Laboratories Limited
 Public Relations: Dennis Davidson Associates
 Music Copyright © ITC Filmscores Limited 1980
 Filmed on location in Paris, and London, and at Shepperton Studio Centre, England
 A Norman Rosenmont Production in association with Marble Arch Productions
 This program was recommended by the National Education Association
 ITC Entertainment Group, Granada International

Production
Producer Norman Rosemont specialised in adaptations of classic novels. Most of the $5 million budget came from Hallmark Greeting Cards. Kenneth More's sizeable supporting role as Jarvis Lorry was his last role on screen.

References

External links
 
 
 

1980 television films
1980 films
1980s historical films
American historical films
Films based on A Tale of Two Cities
Films set in London
Films set in Paris
Films directed by Jim Goddard
Films with screenplays by John Gay (screenwriter)
Hallmark Hall of Fame episodes
Fiction set in the 1790s
Television shows based on works by Charles Dickens
1980s English-language films
1980s American films